Yauri, or Espinar, is a town in southern Peru, capital of Espinar Province in Cusco Region.

See also
2009 Espinar bus crash

Populated places in the Cusco Region